The A. C. Houen Grant was a grant that awarded funds to Norwegian artists. The grant was established by the Norwegian businessman and philanthropist Anton Christian Houen (1823–1894). There is some uncertainty about some of the awards that were associated with this fund, including whether the painter Astri Welhaven Heiberg received the grant in the 1920s. 

The grant was created in 1885 under the name A. C. Houen Grant for Norwegian Artists and Scientists. It was an extension of the Norwegian Artists' Travel and Education Fund, which was created by Houen in 1878.

The grant's rules did not exclude repeated awards to the same artist; Ragnvald Hjerlow, Harald Dal, and Arne Lofthus are among the artists that received the grant several times. The grant awarded scholarships by application, which could be enclosed with recommendations from other artists. When the musician and composer Eyvind Alnæs applied for a grant in 1892, his application included a recommendation from Edvard Grieg. Alnæs received the grant, and he used the funds to travel to Leipzig for further study.

The grant was merged with the Conrad Mohr Grant toward the end of the 20th century, and it is now known as the Houen and Mohr Grant for Artists.

Recipients (selected) 
 1890: Ragnvald Hjerlow, painter
 1891: Ragnvald Hjerlow (second award)
 1892: Eyvind Alnæs, composer, organist, and choir conductor
 1892: Gabriel Finne, writer
 1895: Harald Sohlberg
 1896: Harald Sohlberg (second award)
 1897: Halfdan Egedius
 1899: Emanuel Vigeland, artist
 1900: Hjalmar Borgstrøm, composer
 1906: Ingebrigt Vik, sculptor
 1907: Arne Lofthus, painter
 1910: Per Reidarson, composer and violinist
 1911: Nikolai Astrup, painter
 1912: Arne Lofthus (second award)
 1917: Kristofer Lange, architect
 1934: Laila Aavatsmark, pianist
 1934: Carl Gustav Sparre Olsen, violinist
 1936(?): Finn Audun Oftedal, pianist and conductor
 1945: Olaf Christiansen, painter
 1947: Marit Isene, opera singer
 1955: Ottar Helge Johannessen, graphic artist and painter
 1960: Harald Peterssen, painter
 1962: Trond Øyen, violinist
 1964: Frank Frantzen, painter and graphic artist
 1968: Jørleif Uthaug, sculptor and painter
 (unknown) Lasse Kolstad, actor
 1983: Ingrid Austlid Rise, jeweler and designer

See also
Houen Foundation Award

References

Norwegian awards
1885 establishments in Norway